Living in the Future's Past is a 2018 American documentary film directed by Susan Kucera, and produced and narrated by Jeff Bridges. The film features Bridges and several scientists and intellectuals discussing how biology, physics, economics, and politics have contributed to the ongoing crises such as climate change and resource depletion. The film features interviews with Bruce Hood, Wesley Clark, Daniel Goleman, Bob Inglis, Oren Lyons, Leonard Mlodinow, Timothy Morton, Mark Plotkin, Ian Robertson, Piers Sellers, and others.

External links
 Film website
 

2018 documentary films
2018 films
American documentary films
2010s English-language films
2010s American films